The Zoo is a British children's mockumentary television series broadcast on CBBC. Produced by BBC Studios and DHX Media, the series follows the daily life of animals at Paignton Zoo and Living Coasts with a comic twist after they have been given human voices and computer-generated mouths. It is also being aired on ABC Me and 7TWO in Australia and Family Channel and Family CHRGD in Canada.

The series is narrated by Hugh Dennis, providing the viewers with a factual yet comical take on events and to converse with the animals to uncover their side of the story. It mainly focuses on Jürgen and his group of gorillas.

The series premiered on CBBC on 14 August 2017. The second series premiered on 9 April 2018.

In September 2018 the show aired as part of the second series of Saturday Mash-Up.

Format
In a format similar to Animal Magic and Walk on the Wild Side, The Zoo features Hugh Dennis as the narrator talking to animals and staff in Paignton Zoo and Living Coasts. The animals were given human voices and computer-generated mouths. Lewis Macleod, Jess Robinson, Richard David-Caine, Jake Pratt and Stuart Garlick voice these animals. Animals are sometimes given accents like the giraffes, penguins, kangaroos and tigers for example. The main catchphrase is "_ is an important daily part of daily life at the zoo and"

Characters

Gorillas 

 Jürgen (Played by Kiondo)- The Silverback and leader of the 4 gorillas that make up his gang. He is self-appointed Boss of the Zoo although all of the animals don't ever listen to him. Jürgen distinctively speaks in a German accent and he is well known to say his catchphrase "Shut Up".
 Geoffrey (Played by Kivu)- Geoffrey is Jürgen's main sidekick and the smartest of the gorillas. He is always correcting Jürgen despite Jürgen himself never listens to him, including being the self-appointed Boss of the Zoo. Geoffrey speaks in a Bristolian accent and often spends time with Dave.
 Dave (Played by N'Dove)-  Dave is a laid-back dopey gorilla who speaks with a surfer accent and he often spends time with Geoffrey. He tends to be mischievous such as taking and eating Jürgen's cake and his "pet" fish named Gertie.
 Hank (Played by Pertinax)- Hank is the oldest gorilla in the troop, he is an old timer who mostly likes to avoid the drama then the other gorillas. Hank appears less frequent compared to the rest of the troop and he never corrects Jurgen despite his age.

References

External links
 
 
 

2017 British television series debuts
2010s British children's television series
British comedy television shows
BBC high definition shows
BBC children's television shows
English-language television shows
Television series by DHX Media
Television series by BBC Studios
British television series with live action and animation